Ali Khan may refer to:

People

Entertainment
 Ali Khan (food blogger), presenter of Cheap Eats
 Ali Khan (singer) (born 1990), Pakistani singer
 Ali Khan (Sufi) (1881–1958), musician and religious leader
 Ali Akbar Khan (1922–2009), Hindustani classical musician
 Ali Baba Khan (born 1993), Pakistani singer
 Ali Rehman Khan (born 1982), Pakistani actor

Military and politics
 Ali Khan (activist) (fl. 2003–2006), Pakistani political activist
 Ali Khan (brigadier) (fl. 1979), Pakistani army officer
 Ali Ahmad Khan (1883–1929), Afghan politician
 Ali Gohar Khan, Pakistani politician
 Ali Mardan Khan (died 1657), Kurdish military leader and administrator
 Ali Mohammed Khan (1706–1748), Rohilla chief in India
 Ali Muhammad Khan (born 1977), Pakistani politician
 Ali S. Khan,  physician and former public health director at CDC

Sport
 Ali Khan (Pakistani cricketer) (born 1989), Pakistani first-class cricketer for Sialkot
 Ali Khan (American cricketer) (born 1990), American bowler of Pakistani origin
 Ali Khan (Sri Lankan cricketer) (born 1993), Sri Lankan cricketer for Chilaw Marians

Places
 Ali Khan, Khyber Pakhtunkhwa, a union council in Pakistan
 Ali Khan, Sistan and Baluchestan, a village in Iran

See also
 Alikhan, a given name and surname
 Prince Aly Khan (1911–1960), Pakistani socialite, racehorse owner and jockey, military officer, and diplomat
 Alyy Khan (born 1968), Pakistani-British actor

Khan, Ali